Lepidoblepharon ophthalmolepis, the scale-eyed flounder, is a species of citharid flounder found in the western Pacific Ocean, where it is found at depths from . This species is the only known member of its genus.

References
 

Pleuronectiformes
Fish described in 1913
Taxa named by Max Carl Wilhelm Weber